Eduard Hundt (3 August 1909 – 22 July 2002) was a German international footballer.

References

1909 births
2002 deaths
Association football defenders
German footballers
Germany international footballers